Camp Lawton or the Millen Prison was a stockade which held Union soldiers who been taken as prisoners-of-war during the American Civil War. It opened in October 1864 near Millen, Georgia, in Jenkins County and had to be evacuated within six weeks, due to the advance of Sherman's army through Georgia.

The area of Magnolia Springs State Park that now comprises the day-use area was used as the prison. The park still houses remnants of the earthen fort that guarded the 10,000-prisoner camp. Two huge timbers, possibly from the prison but more likely from work done by the Civilian Conservation Corps between 1938 and 1942, were recovered. The park's new History Center currently displays some of the first artifacts excavated by the archaeology team from Georgia Southern University. Georgia Southern's Sociology/Anthropology Department has been conducting surveys and excavations for a number of years at the park, serving as a partner in revealing and interpreting the history of Camp Lawton.

History
Camp Lawton was established during the Civil War in the fall of 1864 by the Confederate Army to house Union prisoners of war. The Magnolia Springs site was selected to take advantage of the abundant water supply. The stockade began receiving the first of at least 10,299 prisoners in early October. The post was abandoned by the end of November when threatened by Sherman's drive on Savannah.

Research using ground-penetrating radar (GPR) conducted in December 2009 by the Lamar Institute of Technology revealed a possible location for the southwest corner of the prison stockade. In 2010 Georgia Southern University undertook archaeological investigations to "ground truth" the results of the GPR survey. In August of that year several Georgia Southern archaeology students uncovered the stockade and around 200 Civil War artifacts. The students had used watercolors by an imprisoned private to locate the site. A fence has been erected to keep people away from the archeological dig near the park's aquarium.

See also
 Magnolia Springs State Park

References

Citations

Sources

 http://www.cnn.com/2014/05/04/us/civil-war-150th-anniversary-prisons/index.html?hpt=hp_c2

External links

 Georgia Southern University webpage

American Civil War prison camps
Buildings and structures completed in 1864
Defunct prisons in Georgia (U.S. state)
Buildings and structures in Jenkins County, Georgia
National Register of Historic Places in Jenkins County, Georgia
Military facilities on the National Register of Historic Places in Georgia (U.S. state)
American Civil War on the National Register of Historic Places
1864 establishments in Georgia (U.S. state)
1864 disestablishments in Georgia (U.S. state)